Maidstone was a parliamentary constituency represented in the House of Commons of the Parliament of the United Kingdom.

The parliamentary borough of Maidstone returned two Members of Parliament (MPs) from 1552 until 1885, when its representation was reduced to one member. The borough was abolished in 1918 and replaced with a county division of the same name, which was abolished for the 1997 general election, and partially replaced by the new Maidstone and The Weald constituency.

History

Before the 19th century
Maidstone was first enfranchised as a parliamentary borough, electing two Members of Parliament, in 1552; at the time it was one of the largest English towns not already represented, and was one of a number of boroughs either enfranchised or re-enfranchised during the reign of Edward VI. However, barely had it won the right than its charter was cancelled after the accession of Mary I as a punishment for the town's part in Wyatt's Rebellion. This was the only recorded instance of a borough's right to return MPs being directly revoked until Grampound was disfranchised for corruption in the 1820s (although there were other cases of temporary suspension or of the right lapsing through disuse in medieval times, when representation was less valued).

After the death of Mary I, Maidstone's right were restored, and it elected members to the Parliament  of 1560, since when the constituency has been continuously represented. The borough consisted of the whole parish of Maidstone, although the boundaries had no practical effect - the right to vote was vested in the freemen of the town, whether or not they were resident within the borough, provided they were not receiving poor relief. In 1833, just after this franchise was reformed by the Great Reform Act, it was estimated that there were 845 freemen, of whom more than 300 lived over seven miles from the town, and 31 of whom were disqualified from voting because they were in receipt of alms. At the 1831 general election, between 600 and 670 men voted.

A borough of this size was too large to fall under the dominance of a local landowner as was usual in the case of the smaller constituencies in the Unreformed Parliament, and Maidstone remained comparatively free with elections sometimes vigorously contested (and usually expensive for the candidates), although the Finch and Marsham families both had a degree of influence over results in the 18th century. Namier describes in detail the Maidstone election of 1761, showing how at this period the organised divisions among the rank-and-file voters in competitive constituencies tended to be religious rather than party-political; the Whig faction in Maidstone drew its strength from the Nonconformists while the Tories were the Anglican establishment. Yet so complicated was the politics of the period that although the local Whigs had asked Rose Fuller, a personal friend of the Whig Prime Minister The Duke of Newcastle, to stand as their candidate Newcastle refused to support him; indeed, Newcastle used his government patronage to force those of the electors employed in the naval dockyard at Chatham to vote for the incumbent Tory MPs, to whom he had already promised his support before Fuller's candidacy was mooted. In the event, though, Fuller succeeded in being elected, many of the government employees defying Newcastle to support him.

After the Reform Act
At the time of the Reform Act, the population of the borough was 15,387, and it contained 3,018 houses. The boundaries of the borough remained unchanged until 1918. Under the reformed franchise, there were 1,108 electors registered to vote at the general election of 1832. The town continued grow so that by 1865 the electorate had reached 1,817, and this was almost doubled by the extension of the franchise in the second reform act, so that there were 3,420 registered electors for the 1868 general election.

The borough retained two MPs until 1885, when its representation was halved; at the 1885 general election the franchise now extended to 6,530 electors, voting for a population of around 35,000. This was a relatively small electorate for the period and made bribery a  practical proposition, and Maidstone was one of a small number of constituencies where corruption was proved after the tightening of election law in the 1880s. Generally a fairly safe Conservative seat, the constituency elected a Liberal candidate against the national tide in 1900, but it was clear that corrupt practices had contributed to his victory and he was unseated on petition; the voters seem to have resented the petition, however, and also elected the Liberal candidate in the ensuing by-election. At the following election in 1906, Maidstone again swung in the opposite direction to the country as a whole, electing a Conservative - one of only five Unionist gains across the country - and the victor was again charged with corruption; on this occasion the candidate was acquitted, but one of the judges noted that "there exists among the voters of this borough a number of the lower class who expect, and are known to respect, a payment or reward for their votes... The proved cases of bribery extend through all the wards."

The county constituency
The borough was abolished with effect from the general election of 1918, but the Maidstone name was transferred to the new county division in which the town stood, which consisted of Maidstone itself and the Maidstone and Hollingbourne rural districts. This contained no towns of any size, but the villages collectively outvoted Maidstone. The new constituency was as safely Conservative as its predecessor, and its boundaries remained unaltered until 1983.

By the 1980s, population growth meant that the constituency was considerably oversized, with one of the largest electorates in England. In the 1983 boundary revisions, which for the first time reflected the local government boundary changes of the 1970s, the size of the Maidstone constituency was considerably reduced. The area to the north-east of the town, and two wards of the town itself, were moved into the new Mid Kent constituency; as these were strongly Conservative wards and there had been a Liberal surge in the area around the time the Liberal-SDP Alliance was formed, the Alliance had some hopes of making a breakthrough in the revised constituency. However, they could only cut the Tory majority to a little over 7,000 in 1983, John Wells taking over half the votes.

Boundary changes in 1997 saw the constituency abolished and replaced with a new Maidstone and The Weald county constituency. The Maidstone town wards which had been in Mid Kent since 1983 were included in the new seat, and a rural part of the Weald to the south of the town, previously in the Tunbridge Wells constituency was also included; but about a third of the electorate in the Maidstone constituency was transferred to the Faversham and Mid Kent constituency - this included the rural wards to the east of the town, but also the Shepway and Park Wood areas of Maidstone proper.

Boundaries
1885-1918: The existing parliamentary borough, excluding a detached part of the parish of Maidstone known as Lodington.

Members of Parliament

Maidstone borough

MPs 1560-1660

MPs 1660-1885

MPs 1885-1918

Maidstone County Constituency (1918-1997)

Elections

Elections in the 1830s

 
 
 
 

 

 

 
 
 
 
 

 
 
 
 

 
  

 

 

 
  
 

Lewis' death caused a by-election.

 

The by-election was declared void, causing another by-election.

Elections in the 1840s

Elections in the 1850s

 

 

 

Dodd's election was declared void on petition due to treating by his agents, causing a by-election.

Elections in the 1860s

Elections in the 1870s
Lee's resignation caused a by-election.

Elections in the 1880s 

 

Ross' death caused a by-election.

Elections in the 1890s

Elections in the 1900s 

unseated on petition

Elections in the 1910s

Elections in the 1920s

Elections in the 1930s

General Election 1939–40:
Another General Election was required to take place before the end of 1940. The political parties had been making preparations for an election to take place and by the Autumn of 1939, the following candidates had been selected; 
Conservative: Alfred Bossom
Labour: Otto L Shaw

Elections in the 1940s

Elections in the 1950s

Elections in the 1960s

Elections in the 1970s

Elections in the 1980s

Elections in the 1990s

See also
 List of parliamentary constituencies in Kent

Notes and references

Sources
 Robert Beatson, "A Chronological Register of Both Houses of Parliament" (London: Longman, Hurst, Res & Orme, 1807) 
 D. Brunton & D. H. Pennington, Members of the Long Parliament (London: George Allen & Unwin, 1954)
 F W S Craig, "British Parliamentary Election Results 1832-1885" (2nd edition, Aldershot: Parliamentary Research Services, 1989)
 T. H. B. Oldfield, The Representative History of Great Britain and Ireland (London: Baldwin, Cradock & Joy, 1816)
 J Holladay Philbin, Parliamentary Representation 1832 - England and Wales (New Haven: Yale University Press, 1965)
 Edward Porritt and Annie G Porritt, The Unreformed House of Commons (Cambridge University Press, 1903)
 Henry Pelling, Social Geography of British Elections 1885-1910 (London: Macmillan, 1967)
 Robert Waller, The Almanac of British Politics (1st edition, London: Croom Helm, 1983; 5th edition, London: Routledge, 1996)
 Frederic A Youngs, jr, "Guide to the Local Administrative Units of England, Vol I" (London: Royal Historical Society, 1979)

Borough of Maidstone
Politics of the Borough of Tunbridge Wells
Constituencies of the Parliament of the United Kingdom disestablished in 1997
Parliamentary constituencies in Kent (historic)
Constituencies of the Parliament of the United Kingdom established in 1560